This is a list of winners and nominees of the Primetime Emmy Award for Outstanding Original Music and Lyrics, awarded to both the composer and lyricist.

The award has gone by several names:
 Outstanding Achievement in Music, Lyrics and Special Material (1970–1973)
 Best Song or Theme (1974)
 Outstanding Achievement in Special Musical Material (1975–1978)
 Outstanding Achievement in Music and Lyrics (1981–1991)
 Outstanding Individual Achievement in Music and Lyrics (1992–1995)
 Outstanding Music and Lyrics (1996–2005)
 Outstanding Original Music and Lyrics (2006–present)

Winners and nominations

1970s

1980s

1990s

2000s

2010s

2020s

Multiple wins

6 wins
 Larry Grossman
 Buz Kohan

3 wins
 Alan & Marilyn Bergman
 Adam Schlesinger
 Ken Welch
 Mitzie Welch

2 wins
 Katreese Barnes
 Ray Charles
 Alf Clausen
 James Di Pasquale
 Fred Ebb
 Marvin Hamlisch
 David Javerbaum
 John Kander
 Ken Keeler
 John Kimbrough
 Artie Malvin
 Randy Newman
 Justin Timberlake

Multiple nominations

15 nominations
 Buz Kohan

12 nominations
 Earl Brown
 Larry Grossman
 Ken Welch
 Mitzie Welch

9 nominations
 Alf Clausen

7 nominations
 Billy Goldenberg

6 nominations
 The Lonely Island
 Adam Schlesinger

5 nominations
 Alan & Marilyn Bergman
 Eli Brueggemann
 Ray Charles
 Justin Timberlake

4 nominations
 Billy Barnes
 Flight of the Conchords
 Marvin Hamlisch
 Butch Hartman
 Fred Karlin
 Ken Keeler
 Robert Lopez
 Steve Marmel
 Guy Moon
 Walter Murphy
 Greg O'Connor

3 nominations
 Kristen Anderson-Lopez
 Katreese Barnes
 Rachel Bloom
 Cy Coleman
 Carol Connors
 Dick DeBenedictis
 James Di Pasquale
 Jack Dolgen
 Fred Ebb
 David Javerbaum
 Labrinth
 Seth MacFarlane
 Seth Meyers
 John Mulaney
 Marc Shaiman
 Michael Silversher
 Patty Silversher
 Dennis Spiegel
 Patrick Williams
 Jim Wise

2 nominations
 John Bettis
 James Bobin
 Bruce Broughton
 Steve Dorff
 Bill Dyer
 Tina Fey
 Debra Fordham
 David Foster
 Taylor Goldsmith
 Arthur Hamilton
 Ron Jones
 John Kander
 Siddhartha Khosla
 John Kimbrough
 Robert Klein
 Joseph LoDuca
 Artie Malvin
 Alan Menken
 Nan Schwartz Mishkin
 Thomas Mizer  
 Curtis Moore
 Mark Mueller
 Randy Newman
 Gary Portnoy
 Dory Previn
 Jeff Richmond
 Glenn Slater
 Danny Smith
 Bob Stein
 Will Stephen
 Morton Stevens
 Kurt Sutter
 Asa Taccone
 Bob Thiele
 Kenan Thompson
 Linda Thompson
 Scott Wittman
 Zendaya

Programs with multiple awards

3 wins
 Saturday Night Live

2 wins
 The Carol Burnett Show
 The Simpsons

Programs with multiple nominations

12 nominations
 Saturday Night Live

9 nominations
 The Simpsons

5 nominations
 Family Guy

4 nominations
 The Fairly OddParents

3 nominations
 The Carol Burnett Show
 Crazy Ex-Girlfriend
 Euphoria
 Flight of the Conchords
 MADtv
 Smash

2 nominations
 Centennial Olympic Games: Opening Ceremonies
 Cop Rock
 Fame
 Growing Pains
 High School Musical
 Jimmy Kimmel Live!
 Kojak
 The Marvelous Mrs. Maisel
 Police Woman Rowan & Martin's Laugh-In Scrubs The Sonny & Cher Comedy Hour Sons of Anarchy This Is Us
 Xena: Warrior Princess

Notes

References

Outstanding Music and Lyrics
Songwriting awards